The athletics competition at the 1998 Asian Games were held in Bangkok, Thailand between 13 and 20 December.

Medalists

Men

Women

Medal table

Participating nations
A total of 451 athletes from 37 nations competed in athletics at the 1998 Asian Games:

References

Asian Games. GBR Athletics. Retrieved on 2014-10-04.
Results. China People. Retrieved on 2014-10-04.
Asian 13th Games. Sport Fieber. Retrieved on 2014-10-04.

External links
Official meet results

 
Athletics
1998
Asian Games
1998 Asian Games